German submarine U-531 was a Type IXC/40 U-boat of Nazi Germany's Kriegsmarine built for service during World War II.
She was laid down at Deutsche Werft in Hamburg as yard number 346 on 22 December 1941, launched on 12 August 1942 and commissioned on 28 October with Oberleutnant zur See Herbert Neckel in command.

Her service began with training as part of the 4th U-boat Flotilla; she then joined the 2nd flotilla for operations on 1 April 1943, before being sunk on 6 May 1943.

Design
German Type IXC/40 submarines were slightly larger than the original Type IXCs. U-531 had a displacement of  when at the surface and  while submerged. She had two shafts and two  propellers.

U-531 was fitted with six  torpedo tubes (four fitted at the bow and two at the stern), 22 torpedoes, one  SK C/32 naval gun, 180 rounds, and a  SK C/30 as well as a  C/30 anti-aircraft gun. The boat had a complement of forty-eight.

Service history

U-531s operational career commenced with her departure from Kiel on 13 April 1943. Heading for the Atlantic, her route took her between Iceland and the Faeroe Islands. On 22 April, in the afternoon, she was attacked southeast of Iceland by a Catalina flying boat of 120 Squadron RAF. That evening, she was attacked again, this time by a British Flying Fortress of 206 Squadron.

Previously recorded fate
The destruction of U-531 had been attributed to the destroyer  and the Flower-class corvette .

Wolfpacks
U-531 took part in three wolfpacks, namely:
 Meise (25 – 27 April 1943)
 Star (27 April – 4 May 1943)
 Fink (4 – 6 May 1943)

References

Bibliography

External links

German Type IX submarines
U-boats commissioned in 1942
U-boats sunk in 1943
World War II submarines of Germany
1942 ships
World War II shipwrecks in the Atlantic Ocean
Ships built in Hamburg
U-boats sunk by British warships
Ships lost with all hands
Maritime incidents in May 1943